An endolithic lichen is a crustose lichen that grows inside solid rock, growing between the grains, with only the fruiting bodies exposed to the air. An example is Caloplaca luteominea subspecies bolandri.

References

Lichenology